Lever mina drömmar is an album by Swedish pop singer Shirley Clamp.  It was released on 20 April 2005 and peaked at number five on the Swedish Albums Chart. The song "Mina minnen" on the album was released as a single on 8 June 2005.

Track listing
"Lever mina drömmar"
"Att älska dig"
"Sanslöst förlorad"
"En ny chans"
"Mina minnen"
"Jag ljuger dig full"
"Sjunde himlen"
"Längtan är allt jag har"
"Du sa tid"
"Lång natts färd mot dag"
"Ärliga blå"
"Dålig mottagning"
"Ensam"
"Som en vind i ditt hår"

Charts

Weekly charts

Year-end charts

References

2005 albums
Shirley Clamp albums
Swedish-language albums